"Dreamin' of Love" is the second single from freestyle singer Stevie B's debut album Party Your Body. It was his first single to chart in Billboard Hot 100. "Dreamin' of Love" contain samples of the song "Do You Have a Car" by Kid Seville.

Track listing
US 12" single

Charts

References

1988 singles
Freestyle music songs
Stevie B songs
1987 songs